Beardsley is an English surname. Notable people with the surname include:

 Albert R. Beardsley, builder of Albert R. Beardsley House in Elkhart, Indiana
 Alfred Beardsley, memorabilia dealer involved in the O. J. Simpson robbery case
 Aubrey Beardsley (1872–1898), English illustrator and poet
 Bartholomew Crannell Beardsley (1775–1855), Canadian lawyer, judge and politician
 Chris Beardsley (born 1984), English footballer
 Craig Beardsley (born 1960), American swimmer
 Dick Beardsley (born 1956), American marathoner
 Don Beardsley (born 1946), Scottish footballer
 Doug Beardsley (born 1941), Canadian poet and educator
 Eben Edwards Beardsley (1808–1892), American clergyman
 Eleanor Beardsley, American radio correspondent based in Paris
 Fred Beardsley (1856–1929), English footballer associated with the foundation of Arsenal F.C.
 Grenville Beardsley, Illinois Attorney General for 1959–1960
 Helen Beardsley (1930–2000), American mother of a blended family with 20 children and writer about her family experiences
 Henry M. Beardsley (1858–1938), Mayor of Kansas City
 Jason Beardsley (born 1989), English footballer
 John Beardsley (cleric) (1732–1808), Canadian clergyman
 John Beardsley (colonel) (1816–1906), Union Army colonel
 John Beardsley (New York politician) (1783–1857), American politician
 Joseph W. Beardsley (1820–1868), Wisconsin politician
 Kevin Beardsley, former New Zealand sprinter
 Levi Beardsley (1785–1857), New York lawyer and politician
 Mabel Beardsley (1871–1916), English actress
 Melville W. Beardsley (1913–1998), American inventor and aeronautical engineer
 Mimi Alford (born 1943), née Beardsley, American woman who allegedly had an affair with President John F. Kennedy
 Monroe Beardsley (1915–1985), American philosopher
 Peter Beardsley (born 1961), English footballer
 Ralph Beardsley (1891–1920), American racecar driver
 Samuel Beardsley (1790–1860), New York lawyer and politician
 William Beardsley (disambiguation)

See also
 Attorney General Beardsley (disambiguation)
 Senator Beardsley (disambiguation)
 Beardslee, also a surname

English-language surnames